The Sofia Psalter (Sofiyski pesnivets), also known as Ivan Alexander's Psalter or the Kuklen Psalter, is a 14th-century Bulgarian illuminated psalter. It was produced in 1337 and belonged to the royal family of Tsar Ivan Alexander of Bulgaria.

Analysis
The psalter, which consists 318 parchment folios, is written in Middle Bulgarian Cyrillic and contains the text of the Psalms along with interpretation by Eusebius of Caesarea, as well as the Nicene Creed and an interpretation of the Lord's Prayer. Of particular importance is the Praise to Ivan Alexander, who ordered the manuscript, contained on folios 311a-312b.

The manuscript is part of the collection of the Library of the Bulgarian Academy of Sciences in Sofia.

See also
 Tomić Psalter, c. 1360
 Gospels of Tsar Ivan Alexander, 1355–1356

References

External links
 Partial text of the Sofia Psalter (with notes in Russian)

Illuminated psalters
Medieval Bulgarian literature
1337 works
History of Sofia
Bulgarian art
Church Slavonic manuscripts